Jegurupadu Combined Cycle Power Plant is located at Jegurupadu in East Godavari district in state of Andhra Pradesh. The power plant is one of the gas based power plants of GVK Group. It was commissioned in 1997.

Capacity 
The power plant has installed capacity of 445 MW.

References

Natural gas-fired power stations in Andhra Pradesh
Buildings and structures in East Godavari district
GVK Group
1997 establishments in Andhra Pradesh
Energy infrastructure completed in 1997
20th-century architecture in India